The Mumbai Chhatrapati Shivaji Maharaj Terminus–Gadag Junction Express is a Express train belonging to Central Railway zone, Mumbai CSMT Division that runs between Chhatrapati Shivaji Maharaj Terminus and  in India. It is currently being operated with 11139/11140 train numbers on six days a week basis.

Service

11139/Mumbai Chhatrapati Shivaji Maharaj Terminus–Gadag Junction Express has average speed of 50 km/hr and covers 753 km in 15h.
11140/Gadag Junction–Mumbai Chhatrapati Shivaji Maharaj Terminus Express has average speed of 49 km/hr and covers 753 km in 15h 30min.

Route and halts 
The important halts of the train are:

Coach composition
The train has standard ICF–CBC rakes with max speed of 110 kmph. The train consists of 12 coaches:

 1 First AC and AC II Tier
 1 AC II Tier
 1 AC III Tier
 4 Sleeper coaches
 3 General Unreserved
 2 Seating cum Luggage Rack

See also 
 Chhatrapati Shivaji Maharaj Terminus
 Gadag Junction railway station

Notes

References

External links 
 11139/Mumbai CSMT–Gadag Express India Rail Info
 11140/Gadag–Mumbai CSMT Express India Rail Info

Transport in Mumbai
Transport in Gadag district
Express trains in India
Rail transport in Maharashtra
Rail transport in Karnataka